Emerson Electric's AN/APG-69 is an X band coherent pulse doppler radar originally designed for the F-20 Tigershark aircraft. It is the successor to the AN/APQ-159. Northrop skipped over the APG-69 for the F-20, choosing the General Electric AN/APG-67 instead. However, the APG-69 was still used by other F-5 operators, and other light fighter projects, including the ALR Piranha.

The APG-69 offered a complete suite of air-to-air and air-to-ground modes. The air-to-air modes included velocity search for long-range wide-angle searches, track-while-scan, single target track and dogfight modes that automatically locked onto the closest target. The APG-69 was capable of guiding the AIM-7 Sparrow missile, making it the first of Emerson's offerings to reach production with beyond visual range capabilities. The air-to-ground modes included moving target search and track, and sea-surface-search modes.

Notes

Aircraft radars
Military radars of the United States
Radars of the United States Air Force
Emerson Electric radars